Vera A. Allison (1902–1993) also known as Vera Gaethke, was an American Modernist jeweler, and abstract painter. She was a co-founder of the Metal Arts Guild of San Francisco, a non-profit, arts educational organization. Allison had lived in San Francisco, Berkeley, and Mill Valley in California; and in San Cristobal, New Mexico.

Early life and education 
Vera Allison was born December 5, 1902, in San Francisco. She attended University of California, Berkeley (U.C. Berkeley), where she received a B.A. degree in Art.

In 1929, she married painter and printmaker George Gaethke (1898–1982), and they had a child.

Career 
After graduation, she travelled in Europe and made paintings in oil paint and watercolors. When she returned to San Francisco, Allison worked as a commercial designer at Foster & Kleiser advertising company.  

When she was returning to work after a period of maternity leave, Allison took adult education classes in jewelry and studied under Loyola Lawson Fourtane (1899–1976) of Sausalito. In 1951, Allison was one of the founding members of the Metal Arts Guild of San Francisco (MAG), a metal arts organization led by Margaret De Patta. Other founding members of MAG included Merry Renk, Irena Brynner, Florence Resnikoff, Byron August Wilson, Peter Macchiarini, Virginia Macchiarini, Francis Sperisen, and Bob Winston.

From 1967 to 1986, Allison lived in Mill Valley, Marin County, California; where she was an active member of the Marin Society of Artists. 

She was part of the group exhibition, Jewelry by Peter Macchiarini, Vera Allison, and Irena Brynner (1952) at San Francisco Museum of Modern Art (SFMoMA). In 1962, Allison was part of an annual members group exhibition with the Society of San Francisco Women Artists (now San Francisco Women Artists) arts organizations at SFMoMA, where she won an award for her jewelry. In 1976, she served as a jury member for the 30th Annual Art Festival (1976) in Civic Center, San Francisco.

End of life, death, and legacy 
She continued to be active in the arts into the late 1970s. In 1986, Allison moved to New Mexico to live with her daughter. She died on August 20, 1993, in La Lama (now Lama Foundation) in San Cristobal, New Mexico at the age of 90.

Her artist files are located in the Smithsonian American Art and Portrait Gallery Library in Washington, D.C..

Exhibitions 

 1947, Vera Allison and George Gaethke, Gump's gallery, San Francisco, California
 1950, solo exhibition, Barry Lambert Gallery, Santa Rosa, California
 1955, Jack London Square Art Festival, Oakland, California
 1952, Jewelry by Peter Macchiarini, Vera Allison, and Irena Brynner, San Francisco Museum of Modern Art, San Francisco, California
 1961, Contemporary Craftsmen of the Far West, Museum of Contemporary Crafts, New York City, New York
 1962, Annual Exhibition of the Society of San Francisco Women Artists, San Francisco Museum of Modern Art, San Francisco, California
 1966, The Art of Personal Adornment, the Museum West of the American Craftsman Council, San Francisco, California

References 

1902 births
1993 deaths
Artists from San Francisco
Artists from Berkeley, California
People from Mill Valley, California
University of California, Berkeley alumni
Modernist designers
American jewelry designers
Women jewellers